The Aphrodite fritillary (Speyeria aphrodite) is a fritillary butterfly, from North America.

This orange coloured fritillary has rows of dark dots or chevrons at the wing edges and black or brown lines more proximally. The ventral sides of the wings are also orange with several rows of white dots. Its wingspan is between 51 and 73 mm.

Aphrodite fritillaries are sensitive to temperature  with population trajectories showing declines in response to climate warming trends.

Subspecies
Listed alphabetically:
S. a. alcestis (Edwards, 1876)
S. a. byblis (Barnes & Benjamin, 1926)
S. a. columbia (H. Edwards, 1877)
S. a. ethene (Hemming, 1933)
S. a. manitoba (F. & R. Chermock, 1940)
S. a. whitehousei (Gunder, 1932)
S. a. winni (Gunder, 1932)

Similar species
 Atlantis fritillary (Speyeria atlantis)
 Great spangled fritillary (Speyeria cybele)
 Northwestern fritillary (Speyeria hesperis)

References

Further reading

External links

Aphrodite Fritillary, Talk about Wildlife

Speyeria
Butterflies of North America
Butterflies described in 1787
Taxa named by Johan Christian Fabricius